Unbiunium, also known as eka-actinium or simply element 121, is the hypothetical chemical element with symbol Ubu and atomic number 121. Unbiunium and Ubu are the temporary systematic IUPAC name and symbol respectively, which are used until the element is discovered, confirmed, and a permanent name is decided upon. In the periodic table of the elements, it is expected to be the first of the superactinides, and the third element in the eighth period. It has attracted attention because of some predictions that it may be in the island of stability. It is also likely to be the first of a new g-block of elements.

Unbiunium has not yet been synthesized. It is expected to be one of the last few reachable elements with current technology; the limit could be anywhere between element 120 and 124. It will also likely be far more difficult to synthesize than the elements known so far up to 118, and still more difficult than elements 119 and 120. The teams at RIKEN in Japan and at the JINR in Dubna, Russia have indicated plans to attempt the synthesis of element 121 in the future after they attempt elements 119 and 120.

The position of unbiunium in the periodic table suggests that it would have similar properties to lanthanum and actinium; however, relativistic effects may cause some of its properties to differ from those expected from a straight application of periodic trends. For example, unbiunium is expected to have a s2p valence electron configuration, instead of the s2d of lanthanum and actinium or the s2g expected from the Madelung rule, but this is not predicted to affect its chemistry much. It would on the other hand significantly lower its first ionization energy beyond what would be expected from periodic trends.

Introduction

History

Fusion reactions producing superheavy elements can be divided into "hot" and "cold" fusion, depending on the excitation energy of the compound nucleus produced. In hot fusion reactions, very light, high-energy projectiles are accelerated toward very heavy targets (actinides), giving rise to compound nuclei at high excitation energies (~40–50 MeV) that may fission or evaporate several (3 to 5) neutrons. In cold fusion reactions (which use heavier projectiles, typically from the fourth period, and lighter targets, usually lead and bismuth), the fused nuclei produced have a relatively low excitation energy (~10–20 MeV), which decreases the probability that these products will undergo fission reactions. As the fused nuclei cool to the ground state, they require emission of only one or two neutrons. However, hot fusion reactions tend to produce more neutron-rich products because the actinides have the highest neutron-to-proton ratios of any element that can presently be made in macroscopic quantities; it is currently the only method to produce the superheavy elements from flerovium (element 114) onward.

Attempts to synthesize elements 119 and 120 push the limits of current technology, due to the decreasing cross sections of the production reactions and their probably short half-lives, expected to be on the order of microseconds. Heavier elements, beginning with element 121, would likely be too short-lived to be detected with current technology, decaying within a microsecond before reaching the detectors. Where this one-microsecond border of half-lives lies is not known, and this may allow the synthesis of some isotopes of elements 121 through 124, with the exact limit depending on the model chosen for predicting nuclide masses. It is also possible that element 120 is the last element reachable with current experimental techniques, and that elements from 121 onward will require new methods.

Because of the current impossibility of synthesizing elements beyond californium (Z = 98) in sufficient quantities to create a target, with einsteinium (Z = 99) targets being currently considered, the practical synthesis of elements beyond oganesson requires heavier projectiles, such as titanium-50, chromium-54, iron-58, or nickel-64. This, however, has the drawback of resulting in more symmetrical fusion reactions that are colder and less likely to succeed. For example, the reaction between 243Am and 58Fe is expected to have a cross section on the order of 0.5 fb, several orders of magnitude lower than measured cross sections in successful reactions; such an obstacle would make this and similar reactions infeasible for producing unbiunium.

Past synthesis attempt
The synthesis of unbiunium was first attempted in 1977 by bombarding a target of uranium-238 with copper-65 ions at the Gesellschaft für Schwerionenforschung (GSI) in Darmstadt, Germany:
 +  → * → no atoms
No atoms were identified.

Prospects for future synthesis

Currently, the beam intensities at superheavy element facilities result in about 1012 projectiles hitting the target per second; this cannot be increased without burning the target and the detector, and producing larger amounts of the increasingly unstable actinides needed for the target is impractical. The team at the Joint Institute for Nuclear Research (JINR) in Dubna has built a new superheavy element factory (SHE-factory) with improved detectors and the ability to work on a smaller scale, but even so, continuing beyond element 120 and perhaps 121 would be a great challenge. It is possible that the age of fusion–evaporation reactions to produce new superheavy elements is coming to an end due to the increasingly short half-lives to spontaneous fission and the looming proton drip line, so that new techniques such as nuclear transfer reactions (for example, firing uranium nuclei at each other and letting them exchange protons, potentially producing products with around 120 protons) would be required to reach the superactinides.

Because the cross sections of these fusion-evaporation reactions increase with the asymmetry of the reaction, titanium would be a better projectile than chromium for the synthesis of element 121, though this necessitates an einsteinium target. This poses severe challenges due to the significant heating and damage of the target due to the high radioactivity of einsteinium-254, but it would nonetheless probably be the most promising approach. It would require working on a smaller scale due to the lower amount of 254Es that can be produced. This small-scale work could in the near future only be carried out in Dubna's SHE-factory.

The isotopes 299Ubu, 300Ubu, and 301Ubu, that could be produced in the reaction between 254Es and 50Ti via the 3n and 4n channels, are expected to be the only reachable unbiunium isotopes with half-lives long enough for detection. The cross sections would nevertheless push the limits of what can currently be detected. For example, in a 2016 publication, the cross section of the aforementioned reaction between 254Es and 50Ti was predicted to be arond 7 fb in the 4n channel, four times lower than the lowest measured cross section for a successful reaction. A 2021 calculation gives similarly low theoretical cross sections of 10 fb for the 3n channel and 0.6 fb for the 4n channel of this reaction, along with cross sections on the order of 1–10 fb for the reactions 249Bk+54Cr, 252Es+50Ti, and 258Md+48Ca. However, 252Es and 258Md cannot currently be synthesized in sufficient quantities to form target material.

Should the synthesis of unbiunium isotopes in such a reaction be successful, the resulting nuclei would decay through isotopes of ununennium that could be produced by cross-bombardments in the 248Cm+51V or 249Bk+50Ti reactions, down through known isotopes of tennessine and moscovium synthesized in the 249Bk+48Ca and 243Am+48Ca reactions. The multiplicity of excited states populated by the alpha decay of odd nuclei may however preclude clear cross-bombardment cases, as was seen in the controversial link between 293Ts and 289Mc. Heavier isotopes are expected to be more stable; 320Ubu is predicted to be the most stable unbiunium isotope, but there is no way to synthesize it with current technology as no combination of usable target and projectile could provide enough neutrons.

The teams at RIKEN and at JINR have listed the synthesis of element 121 among their future plans. These two laboratories are best suited to these experiments as they are the only ones in the world where long beam times are accessible for reactions with such low predicted cross-sections.

Naming
Using Mendeleev's nomenclature for unnamed and undiscovered elements, unbiunium should be known as eka-actinium. Using the 1979 IUPAC recommendations, the element should be temporarily called unbiunium (symbol Ubu) until it is discovered, the discovery is confirmed, and a permanent name chosen. Although widely used in the chemical community on all levels, from chemistry classrooms to advanced textbooks, the recommendations are mostly ignored among scientists who work theoretically or experimentally on superheavy elements, who call it "element 121", with the symbol E121, (121), or 121.

Nuclear stability and isotopes 
The stability of nuclei decreases greatly with the increase in atomic number after curium, element 96, whose half-life is four orders of magnitude longer than that of any currently known higher-numbered element. All isotopes with an atomic number above 101 undergo radioactive decay with half-lives of less than 30 hours. No elements with atomic numbers above 82 (after lead) have stable isotopes. Nevertheless, for reasons not yet well understood, there is a slight increase of nuclear stability around atomic numbers 110–114, which leads to the appearance of what is known in nuclear physics as the "island of stability". This concept, proposed by University of California professor Glenn Seaborg and stemming from the stabilizing effects of the closed nuclear shells around Z = 114 (or possibly 120, 122, 124, or 126) and N = 184 (and possibly also N = 228), explains why superheavy elements last longer than predicted. In fact, the very existence of elements heavier than rutherfordium can be attested to shell effects and the island of stability, as spontaneous fission would rapidly cause such nuclei to disintegrate in a model neglecting such factors.

A 2016 calculation of the half-lives of the isotopes of unbiunium from 290Ubu to 339Ubu suggested that those from 290Ubu to 303Ubu would not be bound and would decay through proton emission, those from 304Ubu through 314Ubu would undergo alpha decay, and those from 315Ubu to 339Ubu would undergo spontaneous fission. Only the isotopes from 309Ubu to 314Ubu would have long enough alpha-decay lifetimes to be detected in laboratories, starting decay chains terminating in spontaneous fission at moscovium, tennessine, or ununennium. This would present a grave problem for experiments aiming at synthesizing isotopes of unbiunium if true, because the isotopes whose alpha decay could be observed could not be reached by any presently usable combination of target and projectile. Calculations in 2016 and 2017 by the same authors on elements 123 and 125 suggest a less bleak outcome, with alpha decay chains from the more reachable nuclides 300–307Ubt passing through unbiunium and leading down to bohrium or nihonium. It has also been suggested that cluster decay might be a significant decay mode in competition with alpha decay and spontaneous fission in the region past Z = 120, which would pose yet another hurdle for experimental identification of these nuclides.

Predicted chemistry
Unbiunium is predicted to be the first element of an unprecedentedly long transition series, called the superactinides in analogy to the earlier actinides. While its behavior is not likely to be very distinct from lanthanum and actinium, it is likely to pose a limit to the applicability of the periodic law; after element 121, the 5g, 6f, 7d, and 8p1/2 orbitals are expected to fill up together due to their very close energies, and around the elements in the late 150s and 160s, the 9s, 9p1/2, and 8p3/2 subshells join in, so that the chemistry of the elements just beyond 121 and 122 (the last for which complete calculations have been conducted) is expected to be so similar that their position in the periodic table would be purely a formal matter.

Based on the Aufbau principle, one would expect the 5g subshell to begin filling at the unbiunium atom. However, while lanthanum does have significant 4f involvement in its chemistry, it does not yet have a 4f electron in its ground-state gas-phase configuration; a greater delay occurs for 5f, where neither actinium nor thorium atoms have a 5f electron although 5f contributes to their chemistry. It is predicted that a similar situation of delayed "radial" collapse might happen for unbiunium so that the 5g orbitals do not start filling until around element 125, even though some 5g chemical involvement may begin earlier. Because of the lack of radial nodes in the 5g orbitals, analogous to the 4f but not the 5f orbitals, the position of unbiunium in the periodic table is expected to be more akin to that of lanthanum than that of actinium among its congeners, and Pekka Pyykkö proposed to rename the superactinides as "superlanthanides" for that reason. The lack of radial nodes in the 4f orbitals contribute to their core-like behavior in the lanthanide series, unlike the more valence-like 5f orbitals in the actinides; however, the relativistic expansion and destabilization of the 5g orbitals should partially compensate for their lack of radial nodes and hence smaller extent.

Unbiunium is expected to fill the 8p1/2 orbital due to its relativistic stabilization, with a configuration of [Og] 8s2 8p1. Nevertheless, the [Og] 7d1 8s2 configuration, which would be analogous to lanthanum and actinium, is expected to be a low-lying excited state at only 0.412 eV, and the expected [Og] 5g1 8s2 configuration from the Madelung rule should be at 2.48 eV. The 8p electron of unbiunium is expected to be very loosely bound, so that its predicted ionization energy of 4.45 eV is lower than that of ununennium (4.53 eV) and all known elements except for the alkali metals from potassium to francium. A similar large reduction in ionization energy is also seen in lawrencium, another element having an anomalous s2p configuration due to relativistic effects.

Despite the change in electron configuration and possibility of using the 5g shell, unbiunium is not expected to behave chemically very differently from lanthanum and actinium. A 2016 calculation on unbiunium monofluoride (UbuF) showed similarities between the valence orbitals of unbiunium in this molecule and those of actinium in actinium monofluoride (AcF); in both molecules, the highest occupied molecular orbital is expected to be non-bonding, unlike in the superficially more similar nihonium monofluoride (NhF) where it is bonding. Nihonium has the electron configuration [Rn] 5f14 6d10 7s2 7p1, with an s2p valence configuration. Unbiunium may hence be somewhat like lawrencium in having an anomalous s2p configuration that does not affect its chemistry: the bond dissociation energies, bond lengths, and polarizabilities of the UbuF molecule are expected to continue the trend through scandium, yttrium, lanthanum, and actinium, all of which have three valence electrons above a noble gas core. The Ubu–F bond is expected to be strong and polarized, just like for the lanthanum and actinium monofluorides.

Hence, the main oxidation state of unbiunium in its compounds should be +3, although the closeness of the valence subshells' energy levels may permit higher oxidation states, just like in elements 119 and 120. The standard electrode potential for the  couple is predicted as −2.1 V.

Notes

References

Bibliography

Further reading
 
 

 
121